Joaquín Montaño Yamuni (born 24 August 1952) is a Mexican politician formerly affiliated with the National Action Party. As of 2014 he served as Senator of the LVIII and LIX Legislatures of the Mexican Congress representing Sinaloa and as Deputy of the LVI Legislature.

References

1952 births
Living people
Politicians from Sinaloa
Members of the Senate of the Republic (Mexico)
Members of the Chamber of Deputies (Mexico)
National Action Party (Mexico) politicians
20th-century Mexican politicians
21st-century Mexican politicians
People from Los Mochis
University of Guadalajara alumni